
Gmina Nowy Kawęczyn is a rural gmina (administrative district) in Skierniewice County, Łódź Voivodeship, in central Poland.

The gmina contains part of the protected area called Bolimów Landscape Park.

Villages
Gmina Nowy Kawęczyn contains the villages and settlements of Adamów, Budy Trzcińskie, Doleck, Dukaczew, Dzwonkowice, Esterka, Franciszkany, Helenków, Kaczorów, Kawęczyn B, Kazimierzów, Kolonia Starorawska, Kwasowiec, Marianka, Marianów, Nowa Trzcianna, Nowy Dwór, Nowy Dwór-Parcela, Nowy Kawęczyn, Nowy Rzędków, Podfranciszkany, Podstrobów, Podtrzcianna, Prandotów, Psary, Raducz, Rawiczów, Rzędków, Sewerynów, Stara Rawa, Stary Rzędków, Strzyboga, Suliszew, Trzcianna, Zglinna Duża and Zglinna Mała.

Neighbouring gminas
Gmina Nowy Kawęczyn is bordered by the gminas of Biała Rawska, Kowiesy, Puszcza Mariańska, Rawa Mazowiecka and Skierniewice.

References
Polish official population figures 2006

Nowy Kaweczyn
Skierniewice County